Coonewah Creek is a stream in the U.S. state of Mississippi. It is a tributary to Town Creek.

Coonewah Creek is a name derived from the Choctaw language or possibly the Chickasaw language, but scholars do not agree on the original meaning of its native name. Variant names are "Colberts Creek" and "Coonewar Creek".

References

Rivers of Mississippi
Rivers of Lee County, Mississippi
Rivers of Pontotoc County, Mississippi
Mississippi placenames of Native American origin